The Bazaar of Arak is one of the first constructed buildings in the city of Arak (central Iran). The bazaar complex, containing a public bath, a mosque, water reservoirs, passages and caravansary, was built at the time of Fath-Ali Shah Qajar and by Yusef Khan-e Gorji, in the middle of Sultan Abad (Arak's former name). This bazaar is centered at Chahr soogh, which is the junction of two north–south and east–west paths that end to four ancient city gates.

History 
The bazaar and the city of Sultan Abad (today Arak) were built simultaneously. Although it took a few years for the city to be built but no exact date has been recorded for the establishment of bazaar. As noted in historical texts it took about twenty years for the whole city to be built. Bazaar was built at the same time. The first buildings in Arak bazaar were built in 19th century by the order of the time governor of Arak, Sepahdar Aazm whose name has remained on a mosque and a school 

One reason to establish this bazaar was the strong economy around Sultan Abad. The high quality of agricultural products in Persian Iraq (Arak) and the world-famous Sarouk Persian carpets brought up the need to establish a central market   to present these commodities was the momentum behind constructing city and the market.

Architecture 

The Arak bazaar Collection is based on a pre-designed plan. Unlike other bazaars here the paths are not free and curved, but routes are geometrically symmetrical. Bazaar with its crossing Alleyways is an example of chess like texture of the ancient city of Sultan Abad.

The special architectural design used keeps the inside of bazaar cool in Summer and warm in winter. The two north–south and east–west axis intersect at a place called chahar soogh (four bazaars). There is a small stone pool right at this junction. The area of the bazar complex sums up to 14 Acres.

The buildings in this bazaar are mainly made of bricks. Gypsum and lime have also been used. Wooden joists in clay have made the buildings stronger. Sheets of copper and lead are used in columns’ bases.

Unique features 
The Bazaar has two east–west and north–south routs which end to four gates of the ancient city, meaning that the at that time the entrance to the city was at Chahar Soogh in bazar. Passages inside are made so that in case of any accident, fire in particular, the crowd can quickly get out and disperse.

Functions 
Economic- Bazaar of Arak  like all other bazaars in Iran is a main center for storing goods and for economic exchanges. The baazar in Arak is now finding its way in internal and global trades. Export of commodities produced in Iran such as dried fruit, handicrafts and handmade carpets, are also done in bazaars.

Social – Bazaar is a place that different social and ethnic groups meet and influence on each other. Bazaar is a place for buyer and seller get together which sometimes leads to the formation of the system of supply and demand.

Political – In Iran's history Bazaars have been a center for rebellion and strikes. In the Iranian constitutional revolution Arak and its bazaar became one important center for struggle against foreign investments. Presently, bazaars in Iran are playing an important role in the revolt against the ruling religious dictatorship.

Water reservoir 
The Bazaar of Arak used to contain a 200-year-old water reservoir. It was demolished by Arak's municipality to make room for a new school. This reservoir with its special double ceiling was one of the rare buildings in Iran.

References

World Heritage Sites in Iran
Iranian art
Architecture in Iran
Islamic architecture
architecture
Buildings and structures in Markazi Province